Worthington Cup may refer to:

 The Football League Cup, an English professional football trophy, known by this name when sponsored by the Worthington brand of beer between 1998 and 2003
 The Worthington Trophy, a Canadian military award